Arnold Joseph Drury (23 July 1912 – 10 October 1995) was an Australian politician. Born in Adelaide, he was educated at Catholic schools before becoming a manufacturing grocer. He served in the military 1942–1945. In 1958, he was elected to the Australian Senate as a Labor Senator for South Australia. He held the seat until his defeat in 1975. Drury died in 1995.

References

Australian Labor Party members of the Parliament of Australia
Members of the Australian Senate for South Australia
Members of the Australian Senate
Australian grocers
1912 births
1995 deaths
20th-century Australian politicians